This page gathers the results of elections in Abruzzo.

Regional elections

Latest regional election

In the latest regional election, which took place on 10 February 2019, Marco Marsilio of Brothers of Italy was elected President of Abruzzo. The League, which fielded candidates for the first time in the region, was the largest party.

List of previous regional elections
1970 Abruzzo regional election
1975 Abruzzo regional election
1980 Abruzzo regional election
1985 Abruzzo regional election
1990 Abruzzo regional election
1995 Abruzzo regional election
2000 Abruzzo regional election
2005 Abruzzo regional election
2008 Abruzzo regional election
2014 Abruzzo regional election

References

 
Politics of Abruzzo